Sergeant Charles Graham Robertson VC MM (4 July 1879 – 10 May 1954) was an English recipient of the Victoria Cross, the highest and most prestigious award for gallantry in the face of the enemy that can be awarded to British and Commonwealth forces.

Robertson first served with the Imperial Yeomanry during the Second Boer War. Robertson was 38 years old, and a lance-corporal in the 10th Battalion, Royal Fusiliers, British Army during the First World War when the following deed took place for which he was awarded the VC.

On 8/9 March 1918 west of Polderhoek Chateau, Belgium, Lance-Corporal Robertson having repelled a strong attack by the enemy, realised that he was being cut off and sent for reinforcements, while remaining at his post with only one man, firing his Lewis gun and killing large numbers of the enemy. No reinforcements arrived, so he withdrew, and then was forced to withdraw again to a defended post where he got on top of the parapet with a comrade, mounted his gun and continued firing. His comrade was almost immediately killed and he was severely wounded, but managed to crawl back with his gun, having exhausted his ammunition.

He served in World War II in the Home Guard.

The Medal
His Victoria Cross is displayed at the Royal Fusiliers Museum in the Tower of London, England.  This and his other medals were presented to the museum by his widow in 1977.

References

Monuments to Courage (David Harvey, 1999)
The Register of the Victoria Cross (This England, 1997)
VCs of the First World War - Spring Offensive 1918 (Gerald Gliddon, 1997)

External links
Location of grave and VC medal (Surrey)

1879 births
1954 deaths
Military personnel from Cumberland
Burials in Surrey
People from Penrith, Cumbria
British World War I recipients of the Victoria Cross
Recipients of the Military Medal
Royal Fusiliers soldiers
British Army personnel of World War I
British Yeomanry soldiers
British Home Guard soldiers
British Army personnel of the Second Boer War
British Army recipients of the Victoria Cross